The Call of Youth is a 1921 British short romance film directed by Hugh Ford. Alfred Hitchcock is credited as a title designer. The film is now lost. It was made at Islington Studios by the British subsidiary of the American company Famous Players-Lasky.

Cast
 Mary Glynne as Betty Overton
 Marjorie Hume as Joan Lawton
 Jack Hobbs as Hubert Richmond
 Malcolm Cherry as James Agar
 Ben Webster as Mark Lawton
 Gertrude Sterroll as Mrs. Lawton
 Victor Humphrey as Peter Hoskins
 John Peachey as Dr. Michaelson
 Ralph Foster as Minister

See also
 Alfred Hitchcock filmography

References

External links

1921 films
1920s romance films
1921 short films
1921 lost films
British silent short films
British black-and-white films
Films directed by Hugh Ford
Islington Studios films
Lost British films
British romance films
Lost romance films
1920s British films